The Rich–Schwartz Building is a historic building in Nashville, Tennessee.  Also known as the Rich, Schwartz & Joseph building, it is named for Julius Rich, Leo Schwartz, and Arthur Joseph.

History
The four-story building was completed circa 1930. It was designed in the Art Deco style by the architectural firm Marr and Holman. It was built on land which belonged to Howell Campbell.

The building was listed on the National Register of Historic Places in 1984.

The building was featured in an article on the Nashville History blog page.

References

Commercial buildings on the National Register of Historic Places in Tennessee
Art Deco architecture in Tennessee
Buildings and structures completed in 1936
Buildings and structures in Nashville, Tennessee
National Register of Historic Places in Nashville, Tennessee